Pare may refer to:

People with the name
 Emmett Paré (1907-1973), tennis player
 Pare, former member of Kotak, an Indonesian band
 Pare Lorentz (1905-1992), American film director
 Richard Pare (born 1948), English photographer
 Paré, a surname (includes a list)

Places
 Goregaon or formerly Pare, now a suburb of Mumbai, India
 Parè, a municipality in the Province of Como, Italy
 Pare, Kediri, a town in East Java, Indonesia
 Pare Mountains, a mountain range in northeastern Tanzania

Other uses
 PARE (aviation), a spin recovery technique in aviation
 Pare (fort), a type of ruins on Rapa Iti
 Pare language, a Bantu language closely related to Taveta
 Pare (music), a concept in the European folk music traditions of Albania
 Pare people, members of an ethnic group indigenous to the Pare Mountains of northern Tanzania
 "Pare" (song), by Camp Mulla
 Pare, a lintel above the door of a Māori wharenui
 Pare, a colloquial name for Auckland Prison

See also
 Pare-Pare, a city in South Sulawesi, Indonesia
 Parre, a municipality in the Province of Bergamo in the Italian region of Lombardy
 Pere (disambiguation)
 Pair (disambiguation)
 Para (disambiguation)
 Pari (disambiguation)
 Paro (disambiguation)
 Pore (disambiguation)
 Pure (disambiguation)